Cubatabaco, short for , is the Cuban state tobacco company.  The company was formed in 1962, after the Cuban tobacco industry had been nationalized by Fidel Castro's socialist government.

Cubatabaco handled all production and distribution of Cuban tobacco products both locally and internationally until 1994, when the firm of Habanos S.A. was formed to export cigars and cigarettes worldwide.

See also
List of cigar brands

References

Tobacco companies of Cuba
Cigar manufacturing companies
Government-owned companies of Cuba